Hugh Willoughby is an American atmospheric and hydrospheric scientist currently at Florida International University and an Elected Fellow of the American Association for the Advancement of Science.

References

Year of birth missing (living people)
Living people
Fellows of the American Association for the Advancement of Science
American geophysicists
Florida International University faculty